Bhimrad is a suburban area located in South West Zone, of Surat. Bhimrad is an actual place where Salt March of dandi was happened

About

See also 
List of tourist attractions in Surat

References 

Suburban area of Surat
Neighbourhoods in Surat